Ifrit is a supernatural creature in Arabic and Islamic cultures.

Ifrit may also refer to:

Ifrit (bird), another name for the blue-capped ifrit
Ifrit (Final Fantasy), a recurring character from the Final Fantasy video game series
Ifrit (Sonic the Hedgehog), a character in the video game Sonic Rivals 2 
 Ifrit, a pair of demonic fiery gauntlets used by Dante in the video game Devil May Cry.